Isaac of Nineveh (Arabic: إسحاق النينوي Ishaq an-Naynuwī; ; c. 613 – c. 700), also remembered as Saint Isaac the Syrian, Abba Isaac, Isaac Syrus and Isaac of Qatar, was a 7th-century Church of the East Syriac Christian bishop and theologian best remembered for his written works on Christian asceticism. He is regarded as a saint in the Assyrian Church of the East, the Catholic churches (Chaldean Catholic, Syro-Malabar Church), and Eastern Orthodox tradition. His feast day falls, together with 4th-century theologian and hymnographer St. Ephrem the Syrian, on January 28.

Life
He was born in the region of Beth Qatraye in Eastern Arabia, a mixed Syriac and Arabic speaking region encompassing the south east of Mesopotamia and the north eastern Arabian peninsula. When still quite young, he entered a monastery where he devoted his energies towards the practice of asceticism. After many years of studying at the library attached to the monastery, he emerged as an authoritative figure in theology. Shortly after, he dedicated his life to monasticism and became involved in religious education throughout the Beth Qatraye region. When the Catholicos Giwargis I (661–680) visited Beth Qatraye in 676 to attend a synod, he ordained Isaac bishop of Nineveh far to the north in Assyria.

The administrative duties did not suit his retiring and ascetic bent: he requested to abdicate after only five months, and went south to the wilderness of Mount Matout, a refuge for anchorites. There he lived in solitude for many years, eating only three loaves a week with some uncooked vegetables, a detail that never failed to astonish his hagiographers. Eventually blindness and old age forced him to retire to the Assyrian monastery of Rabban Shabur in Mesopotamia, where he died and was buried. At the time of his death he was nearly blind, a fact that some attribute to his devotion to study.

Legacy

Isaac is remembered for his spiritual homilies on the inner life, which have a human breadth and theological depth that transcends the Christianity of the Church of the East, the Church to which he belonged. They survive in Syriac manuscripts and in later Greek, Arabic, and Georgian translations. From Greek they were translated into Slavonic.

Isaac stands in the tradition of the eastern mystical saints and placed a considerable emphasis on the work of the Holy Spirit.

His melancholic style as well as his affinity towards the sick and dying exerted considerable influence on Eastern Orthodoxy. His writings were continuously studied by monastery circles outside his church during the 8th and 9th century. Moreover, Isaac's conviction that the notion of God punishing men endlessly through the mystery of Gehenna (the lake of fire, or hell) is not compatible with his all encompassing love can likely be seen as the central thematic conflict in his second treatise of mystical teachings.

Isaac's writings offer a rare example of a large corpus of ascetical texts written by an experienced hermit and is thus an important writer when it comes to understanding early Christian asceticism.

Writings
The instructions of Isaac the Syrian came to us in several books. The First book contains 82 chapters while the Second contains 41. There is also a Third book which has been translated into Italian and English. Here are some examples:

 Faith, God's providence, prayer

To whatever extent a person draws close to God with his intentions, is to what extent God draws close to him with His gifts.

A handful of sand, thrown into the sea, is what sinning is, when compared to God's Providence and mercy. Just like an abundant source of water is not impeded by a handful of dust, so is the Creator's mercy not defeated by the sins of His creations.

The natural that precedes faith is the path toward faith and toward God. Being implanted by God into our nature, it alone convinces us for the need to believe in God, Who had brought everything into being.

Those, in whom the light of faith truly shines, never reach such unashamedness as to ask God: "Give us this," or — "Remove from us this." Because their spiritual eyes — with which they were blessed by that genuine Father, Who with His great love, countlessly transcends any fatherly love — continually view the Father's Providence, they are not concerned in the slightest about themselves. God can do more than anyone else, and can assist us by a far greater measure than we could ever ask for, or even imagine."

The mouth which is continuously giving thanks receives blessing from God. In the heart that always shows gratitude, grace abides (Brock, 1997).

The aim of prayer is that we should acquire from it love of God, for in prayer are to be found all sorts of reason for loving God (Brock, 1997).

Do not consider a long time spent in worship before God to be wasted (Brock, 1997)

Undistracted prayer is prayer which produces the continual thought of God in the soul (Brock, 1997)

At the time of darkness, more than anything else kneeling is helpful (Brock, 1997).

The more a person enters the struggle for the sake of God, the closer will his heart come to freedom of converse in prayer (Brock, 1997).

 Obeying God

"To select a good deed depends on the initiator; to realize the intention — that is God’s deed. Consequently, let us adhere to the rule, so that every good intention that comes to us is followed by frequent prayers, appealing to God to not only grant us help, but also if it is pleasing or not to Him. Because not every good intention comes from God, but only those that are beneficial.

Sometimes, a person wishes something good, but God doesn’t help him — maybe because the intention came from the devil and is not for our benefit; or maybe because it is beyond our strength as we have not attained the necessary spiritual level; or maybe because it doesn’t correspond to our calling; or maybe because the time is not right to initiate it; or maybe because we don’t have the necessary knowledge or strength to accomplish it; or maybe because circumstances will not contribute to its success. Besides this, the devil contrives in every way to paint it as something good so that having inclined us toward it, he could upset our spiritual tranquility or inflict harm on us. That’s why it is necessary for us to diligently examine all our good desires. Better still, do everything after seeking counsel."

Begin every action that is for God's sake joyfully (Brock, 1997).

Make sure you see to small things, lest otherwise you may push aside important ones (Brock, 1997).

 Love towards your neighbor, mercy, non-judgmentalness

Do not demand love from your neighbor, because you will suffer if you don't receive it; but better still, you indicate your love toward your neighbor and you will settle down. In this way, you will lead your neighbor toward love.

Don't exchange your love toward your neighbor for some type of object, because in having love toward your neighbor, you acquire within yourself Him, Who is most precious in the whole world. Forsake the petty so as to acquire the great; spurn the excessive and everything meaningless so as to acquire the valuable.

Shelter the sinner if it brings you no harm. Through this you will encourage him toward repentance and reform — and attract the Lord's mercy to yourself. With a kind word and all possible means, fortify the infirm and the sorrowful and that Right Arm that controls everything, will also support you. With prayers and sorrow of your heart, share your lot with the aggrieved and the source of God's mercy will open to your entreaties.

When giving, give magnanimously with a look of kindness on your face, and give more than what is asked of you.

Do not distinguish the worthy from the unworthy. Let everyone be equal to you for good deeds, so that you may be able to also attract the unworthy toward goodness, because through outside acts, the soul quickly learns to be reverent before God.

He who shows kindness toward the poor has God as his guardian, and he who becomes poor for the sake of God will acquire abundant treasures. God is pleased when He sees people showing concern for others for His sake. When someone asks you for something, don't think: "Just in case I might need it, I shall leave it for myself, and God — through other people — will give that person what he requires." These types of thoughts are peculiar to people that are iniquitous and do not know God. A just and generous person would not compromise the honor of helping and relinquish it to another person, and he would never pass up an opportunity to help. Every beggar and every needy person receives the necessary essentials, because God doesn't neglect anyone. But you, having sent away the destitute with nothing, spurned the honor offered to you by God and thereby, distanced yourself from His grace.

Through God's providence, he who respects every person for God's sake, privately acquires help from every human being."

Universal Reconciliation
Various scholars have noted that Brock's translation of the Second Part of Isaac's writings (discovered 1983) appears to confirm claims of earlier universalist historians such as John Wesley Hanson (1899) that Isaac was an advocate of universal reconciliation. In chapter 39 of the Second Part, Isaac writes, "It is not the way of the compassionate Maker to create rational beings in order to deliver them over mercilessly to unending affliction in punishment for things of which He knew even before they were fashioned, aware how they would turn out when He created them, and whom nonetheless He created." Likewise, in the Third Part, chapter 5, Isaac explains, "This is the mystery: that all creation by means of One, has been brought near to God in a mystery; then it is transmitted to all; thus all is united to Him...This action was performed for all of creation; there will, indeed, be a time when no part will fall short of the whole." 

Even in the First Part (Isaac's well-known Ascetical Homilies), however, there are arguably quite a few hints of universalism. For example, see the following quotes and excerpts: "God will not abandon anyone." "There was a time when sin did not exist, and there will be a time when it will not exist." "As a handful of sand thrown into the ocean, so are the sins of all flesh as compared with the mind of God; as a fountain that flows abundantly is not dammed by a handful of earth, so the compassion of the Creator is not overcome by the wickedness of the creatures... If He is compassionate here, we believe that there will be no change in Him; far be it from us that we should wickedly think that God could not possibly be compassionate; God’s properties are not liable to variations as those of mortals... What is hell as compared with the grace of resurrection? Come and let us wonder at the grace of our Creator." Many other relevant passages throughout the corpus of Isaac's writings could be cited in demonstration of his belief in eventual universal salvation.

See also
Anthony the Great
Apocatastasis
Arab Christians
Asceticism
Christian Universalism
Church Fathers
Church of the East
East Syriac Rite
Ephrem the Syrian
John of the Ladder
Monastic silence
Philokalia
Syriac Christianity

References

External links

 
St Isaac of Nineveh Orthodox Icon and Synaxarion
A collection of resources on St. Isaac

Saint Isaac, the Syrian in orthodoxwiki.com
Online edition of the Ascetical Homilies
Saint Isaac of Nineveh Facebook Page, featuring new translations from Syriac and Arabic
Encyclopaedia Britannica's article on Isaac of Nineveh

Year of birth uncertain
7th-century Syrian bishops
7th-century Christian mystics
7th-century Christian saints
7th-century bishops of the Church of the East
Christian universalist clergy
Christian universalist theologians
Mesopotamian saints
Patristic mystics
Syriac writers
Syrian Christian mystics